Biswarup Mukhopadhyaya (born 1 August 1960) is an Indian theoretical high energy physicist and a senior professor at Indian Institute of Science Education and Research, Kolkata (IISER Kolkata). Known for his research on High energy colliders, Higgs bosons, neutrinos, Mukhopadhyaya is an elected fellow of the National Academy of Sciences, India. The Council of Scientific and Industrial Research, the apex agency of the Government of India for scientific research, awarded him the Shanti Swarup Bhatnagar Prize for Science and Technology, one of the highest Indian science awards, for his contributions to physical sciences in 2003.

Biography 
Mukhopadhyaya, who secured his PhD from the Rajabazar Science College campus of Calcutta University, has done reportedly notable work on neutrino mass and is known to have been successful in theorizing that gauge boson fusion as the dominant mode of  supersymmetric particle production. He has delivered invited lectures at a number of conferences and was a member of the national organizing committees of the International Conference on particles, Strings and Cosmology (PASCOS), held in Mumbai in 2003 as well as the XXI DAE-BRNS High Energy Physics Symposium held in 2014. His studies have been documented by way of a number of articles and ResearchGate , an online article repository of scientific articles, has listed 184 of them. He has also edited one book, Physics at the Large Hadron Collider, along with Amitava Datta and Amitava Raychaudhuri and has contributed chapters to books edited by others.

Selected bibliography

Books

Chapters

Articles

See also 
 Large Hadron Collider
 Higgs boson

Notes

References

External links 
 

Bengali physicists
Bengali scientists
Recipients of the Shanti Swarup Bhatnagar Award in Physical Science
Indian scientific authors
1960 births
Living people
Fellows of The National Academy of Sciences, India
University of Calcutta alumni
Indian theoretical physicists
Scientists from Allahabad